The Institute of Business Management (IoBM) is a private university and business school in Karachi, Pakistan. IoBM is composed of four colleges, the College of Business Management (CBM), the College of Economics and Social Development (CESD), the College of Computer Science and Information Systems (CCSIS) and the College of Engineering Sciences (CES).

In January 1998, a bill was unanimously approved by the Sindh Provincial Assembly for establishing a university known as the Institute of Business Management in the private sector.

Overview 

IoBM started in 1995 as College of Business Management offering BBA, MBA and Phd degrees.

IoBM is built on a  site.

IoBM is only university in Pakistan, where undergraduate programs BBA, BCS and all BS Joint (Honors) have a compulsory foreign language course, which makes IoBM programs distinguished. List of foreign language includes
 Arabic
 Chinese
 French
 German
 Italian
 Japanese
 Turkish
Mostly, these languages are taught by persons belonging to respective embassies, giving great exposure to students

Academic programs

College of Business Management 
 BBA (Honors)
 BS (Honors) Economics and Finance
 BS (Honors) Accounting and Finance 
 BS Entrepreneurship
 BS Social Entrepreneurship and Social Leadership
 BS Industrial Management
 BS Logistics and Supply Chain Management
 MBA (Regular)
 MBA (Executive)
 MBA Health and Hospital Management
 MBA Advertising and Media Management
 MBA Finance and Risk Management
 MBA Environment and Energy Management
 MBA Educational Management
 MBA Logistics and Supply Chain Management
 MS in Business Management
 MS in English Applied Linguistics
 MPhil in Business Management
 PhD in Business Management
 PhD in Environmental and Energy Management

College of Computer Science and Information Systems 
 BS Computer Science
 BS Actuarial Science and Risk Management
 BS Mathematics and Economics
 BS Data Science
 BS Mathematics and Computational Finance
 BS Software Engineering
 BS Statistics and Business Analytics
 MS Mathematics and Scientific Computing
 MS Statistics and Scientific Computing
 MS Computer Science
 PhD Computer Science
 PhD Statistics and Scientific Computing

College of Engineering and Sciences 
 BE Electrical Engineering in Electronic and Telecommunication
 MS Engineering Management
 MS in Electrical Engineering

College of Economics and Social Development 
 BS (Honors) Accountancy, Management & Law
 BS (Honors) Media Studies
 BS Economics, Law and International Relations (ELI)
 BS Economics, Media and International Relations (EMI)
 BS (Honors) in Business and Psychology
 BS Psychology
 BS Education
 MBA Educational Management
 MSc Organizational Psychology and Human Resource Management
 MSc Energy Economics, Environment and Policy
 MPhil in Organizational Psychology
 MS Economics
 MPhil Education
 PhD Education
 PhD Economics

Admissions 
IoBM admissions are held twice in a year (March and August) for all programs and thrice ( March, June & Dec) for Executive MBA Students

Student life
IoBM has a unique type of Event Organization system as compared to other institutes in Karachi. Here, students of different societies arrange all the events themselves with no professional or financial help from IoBM as IoBM's management believes that its students should be self-dependent & take up tasks themselves which will have a positive impact on their personality development. All the recent events in IoBM such as Fun Week (the last week of a graduating batch), CBMUN (Model United Nation) Jashan e Baharan, the Public talk by Imran Khan had been arranged by the society members themselves.
 Entertainment Plus Society (EPS) - Organised all the events related to entertainment such as concerts, functions etc.
 Digicon Informatics Society (DIS)
Social Welfare And Trust (SWAT) - Responsible for social work
 Alumni Development Program (ADP)
 Mathematics society
 Dialogue Society
 Egalitarians Society
 Strategic Human Resource Society (SHRS)
 The Literary and Public Speaking Society - Responsible for organizing debates, and a literature festival.
 CBM Society of Health Managers (CSHM)
 The Management Society
 The Marketing Society
 Vanquishers - Organizing the sports events in IoBM.
 Media society
 IoBM Club For Entrepreneurs.
 Actuarial Science & Risk Management Society (ARMS)

Membership in professional bodies 
IoBM is an active member of the following international and national professional bodies.
 International Association of Universities
 International Association of University Presidents
 Association of Commonwealth Universities, UK
 Association of Universities of Asia and the Pacific (AUAP), Thailand
 Association to Advance Collegiate Schools of Business, USA
 Asian Media Information and Communication Centre (AMIC), Singapore
 Management Association of Pakistan (MAP), (Member, Executive Committee)
 Marketing Association of Pakistan (Vice President for the year 2010-2011)
 Employers Federation of Pakistan
 Institute of Corporate Governance
 International Finance Corporation, USA (IFC)

References

External links 
 Location

Universities and colleges in Karachi
1995 establishments in Pakistan
Business schools in Pakistan
Engineering universities and colleges in Pakistan